Datta Narayan Patil (also known as Dattatray Patil) was an Indian politician who served as Leader of the Opposition in the Maharashtra Legislative Assembly for two times from 27 November 1987 to 22 December 1988 and 20 October 1989 to 3 March 1990.

Personal life 
He died in 2011 at the age of 84. Her niece Meenakshi Patil served as Member of the Legislative Assembly from Alibag Assembly constituency.

References 

Leaders of the Opposition in the Maharashtra Legislative Assembly
2011 deaths
Bombay State MLAs 1957–1960
Maharashtra MLAs 1967–1972
Maharashtra MLAs 1972–1978
Maharashtra MLAs 1978–1980
Maharashtra MLAs 1980–1985
Maharashtra MLAs 1985–1990
Maharashtra MLAs 1990–1995